Nduka Onwuegbute (born May 22, 1969) is a Nigerian British playwright and author. He is the fifth of sixteen children and was born in Manchester though he grew up Nigeria. He was educated at the University of Ibadan and the University of Jos, both in Nigeria. While in Nigeria, he wrote for the soap opera Riddles & Hopes. His work includes plays, short stories, and an educational book for children. He currently lives in the United Kingdom.

Bibliography

Television 
 Riddles & Hopes (Nigerian Television Authority)

Plays 
 Family Circle
 Dancing the Fool
 Drums that Dance in the Dark (2007)

Prose 
 Masters of the Confluence (2010) 
 Fortune of the Forgotten Forest (2010) 
 Abaci's Number Add-Ventures (2011)

References

External links 
 Official Website
 E-book edition of Drums that Dance in the Dark

1969 births
Nigerian dramatists and playwrights
University of Ibadan alumni
University of Jos alumni
Living people